East Hauxwell or Hauxwell is a village and civil parish in the Richmondshire district of North Yorkshire, England. It is located south of Catterick Garrison.

To the west of the village lies the Grade II* listed Hauxwell Hall, a 17th-century country house belonging to the Dalton family.

Notable people
 Sir Richard Dalton
 Mark Pattison
 Dorothy Wyndlow Pattison ("Sister Dora")

References

External links

Villages in North Yorkshire
Civil parishes in North Yorkshire
Richmondshire